André Felipe Ribeiro de Souza (born 27 September 1990), also known as André Club is a Brazilian professional footballer who plays as a striker.

Club career

André signed a professional contract with Santos in 2009.

Santos

2009/10 Campeonato Brasileiro Série A
Andre made a total of 15 appearances in Campeonato Brasileiro Série A during the 2009/2010 season, scoring 7. On 8 May 2010, André scored in the opening game of the Brasileiro versus Botafogo, putting Santos 2–1 ahead in the first half.
André, wearing the number 9 shirt, was an important member of the victorious Santos team which took the 2010 Paulista crown, topping the table for the majority of the season and beating Santo Andre in the well contested final. He was Santos second top scorer during the Paulista season with 13 goals.

Dynamo Kyiv
On 15 June 2010 the 19-year-old centre forward left FC Santos and joined Ukrainian club FC Dynamo Kyiv for €8 million. He made his debut for Kyiv in a Champions League Playoff Qualifier 1st leg match vs Ajax. André Felipe scored his first goal on 27 October against PFC Sevastopol. The result of that match was 1–2 for FC Dynamo Kyiv.

Girondins de Bordeaux
On 31 January 2011, André joined Bordeaux on a six-month loan deal with an option for a permanent move.

Atlético Mineiro
On 19 July 2011, Andre was announced as the new reinforcement for Atlético Mineiro. After a bidding war between the club from Minas Gerais and Flamengo, Atletico made the proposal that pleased Dynamo's board the most, when they agreed to buy 20% of the player's pass for 2.2 million euros. André signed a one-year contract. In his debut, Andrew scored his first goal, against Fluminense. Following the season, the player made good matches, scoring 7 goals and became absolute owner of the team. On 22 April 2012, Atlético Mineiro announced the purchase of the remaining 80% of the economic rights of André, which still belonged to Dynamo Kiev. The transaction counted on help from an investment group, whose name was not revealed by alvinegro miner. Amounts paid to the Ukrainian team and the time the new contract with Atletico André were not disclosed by the press office of the mining team. André won the State Championship in 2012, earning three individual awards and being the second-highest scorer in the competition. On 18 July 2012, the president Alexandre Kalil, through a statement released on the club's website reported that due to withdrawal of the payment of the remaining economic rights of the group by André DIS / Probe, which had pay from its own resources the rest of the Athletic percentage, thus effecting the outright purchase of the player by Atlético Mineiro.

Return to Santos
On 9 August 2012, André returned to Santos, with Peixe buying 25% of his rights in a 2.25 million euros fee, with a loan contract until December 2013.

In January 2013, after being ten games without scoring and falling in the pecking order, André was criticized by his manager Muricy Ramalho due to his fitness problems. He then scored two goals against XV de Piracicaba on 24 February and reduced the pressure on him.

Corinthians
In January 2016, André signed with Corinthians for an undisclosed fee.

Gremio
In February 2019, he signed a three-year contract with Grêmio after one on loan with them from Sport Recife.

International career

Brazil
André debuted for Brazil in a friendly international against USA on 10 August 2010 at the New Meadowlands Stadium.
He has made four appearances scoring no goals so far.

Career statistics

Club

International
.

Honours

Santos
Campeonato Paulista: 2010
Copa do Brasil: 2010
Recopa Sudamericana: 2012

Atlético Mineiro
Campeonato Mineiro: 2012, 2015
Recopa Sudamericana: 2014
Copa do Brasil: 2014

Grêmio
Campeonato Gaúcho: 2019

References

External links
 
 
 

1990 births
Living people
Brazilian footballers
Brazilian expatriate footballers
Expatriate footballers in Ukraine
Expatriate footballers in France
Expatriate footballers in Portugal
Santos FC players
FC Dynamo Kyiv players
FC Girondins de Bordeaux players
Gaziantep F.K. footballers
Clube Atlético Mineiro players
CR Vasco da Gama players
Sport Club do Recife players
Sport Club Corinthians Paulista players
Sporting CP footballers
Grêmio Foot-Ball Porto Alegrense players
Cuiabá Esporte Clube players
Campeonato Brasileiro Série A players
Ukrainian Premier League players
Ligue 1 players
Primeira Liga players
Süper Lig players
Brazil international footballers
People from Cabo Frio
Brazilian expatriate sportspeople in Ukraine
Brazilian expatriate sportspeople in France
Brazilian expatriate sportspeople in Portugal
Brazilian expatriate sportspeople in Turkey
Association football forwards
Sportspeople from Rio de Janeiro (state)